Anna Löwenstein (also spelt Lowenstein; born 1951) is a British Esperantist.<ref name="ref1">Trarigardo de la E-Gazetaro – 04.05.2004 , Radio Polonia (in Esperanto). Retrieved 5 November 2010</ref> She worked for the World Esperanto Association 1977–1981. Under the name Anna Brennan she founded and was editor of the feminist magazine Sekso kaj Egaleco 1979–1988, and she edited the 'easy language' section of Kontakto 1983–1986. She has written some non-fiction, and two novels. Her historical novel The Stone City (La Ŝtona Urbo), was first published in English and Esperanto in 1999, and has since been translated into French (2010) and Hungarian (2014). Her second novel Morto de artisto'' (2008) was published in Esperanto. She is well known as a journalist, teacher and activist in the Esperanto movement, and has been a member of the Academy of Esperanto since 2001.

Anna has more than 20 years of experience in teaching Esperanto.

She is married to Renato Corsetti, a former president of the World Esperanto Association. The couple lived together in Italy from 1981, but since 2015 they have been living in the UK.

Her father was the actor Heinz Bernard.

References

1951 births
20th-century British novelists
20th-century British women writers
21st-century British novelists
21st-century British women writers
British Esperantists
Living people
Writers of Esperanto literature